Narcisco Orán (born 17 May 1953) is a Panamanian weightlifter. He competed in the men's flyweight event at the 1976 Summer Olympics.

References

External links
 

1953 births
Living people
Panamanian male weightlifters
Olympic weightlifters of Panama
Weightlifters at the 1976 Summer Olympics
Place of birth missing (living people)
Pan American Games medalists in weightlifting
Pan American Games silver medalists for Panama
Weightlifters at the 1975 Pan American Games
20th-century Panamanian people
21st-century Panamanian people